Andrew Downes (20 August 1950 – 2 January 2023) was a British classical composer. He was head of the School of Composition and Creative Studies at Birmingham Conservatoire from 1992 until 2005. His compositions have been performed and broadcast internationally.

Early life 
Downes was born in Handsworth, Birmingham. He attended St. John's College, Cambridge, on a scholarship, receiving his master's degree in composition. In 1974 he studied with Herbert Howells at the Royal College of Music. Downes was head of the School of Composition and Creative Studies at Birmingham Conservatoire from 1992 until 2005, when he retired due to ill health. He kept working as a freelance composer.

Career 
In addition to live performances, Downes' music has been broadcast on BBC Radios 2, 3, and 4, BBC TV, France Musique, Italian TV, Austrian Radio, Dutch Radio, Czech Radio, and Central Peking Radio. Seventeen CDs have been made of his music.

He composed The Marshes of Glynn for the Royal opening of the Adrian Boult Hall in Birmingham in 1986, and his Centenary Fire Dances were first performed for the City of Birmingham's Centenary Festival of Fireworks and Music. He wrote an Overture for the Three Choirs Festival. His vocal music includes songs for the Cantamus Girls Choir, song cycles for Sarah Walker and the tenor John Mitchinson broadcast on BBC Radio 3, and anthems for the BBC 4 Daily Service.

He composed music for horns, including Sonata for Eight Horns for the Horn Octet of the University of New Mexico and Suite for Six Horns for the Vienna Horn Society. After a successful recording of Sonata for Eight Horns by hornists of the Czech Philharmonic Orchestra, Downes was commissioned to write Concerto for four Horns and Orchestra for the orchestra, played at the Dvorak Hall in Prague in February and March 2002. In March 2003 the work was recorded for broadcast by Czech Radio. In 2005, Downes returned to Prague hear the Czech Philharmonic Horns play his Five Dramatic Pieces for Eight Wagner Tubas.

Downes composed Song of the Eagle for the James Madison University Flute Choir of Virginia, and Concerto for Two Pianos for the Duo Scaramouche, Sonata for Eight Pianists for soloists from France, Italy and Britain. He wrote Mela Kamavardhani for Indo-Jazz Fusions musicians in Calcutta, Delhi, and Bombay, and Fanfare for Madam Speaker for the installation of Betty Boothroyd MP as Chancellor of the Open University in 1994. Instrumental music included Concerto for Two Guitars written for Simon Dinnigan and Fred T. Baker playing with strings from the City of Birmingham Symphony Orchestra, the Concert Overture Towards a New Age commissioned for the 150th anniversary of the British Institution of Mechanical Engineers, which was premiered at the Symphony Hall, Birmingham, by the Royal Philharmonic Orchestra, and Suite for Brass Sextet written for the Czech Philharmonic Brass Sextet.

Personal life 
Downes married his wife, Cynthia, in 1976. She published his music under the company name Lynwood Music.

Downes died on 2 January 2023, at age 72.

Legacy 
A performance prize in his name, and supported by his family, was begun by Birmingham Conservatoire during his lifetime.

References

External links 
 

 Andrew Downes at artistnation.org
 
 Andrew Downes at British Music Collection

1950 births
2023 deaths
20th-century British male musicians
20th-century classical composers
20th-century English composers
21st-century British male musicians
21st-century classical composers
English classical composers
Alumni of the Royal College of Music
Alumni of St John's College, Cambridge
Musicians from Birmingham, West Midlands
English male classical composers
People from Handsworth, West Midlands